Gilson César Santos Alves (born 23 January 1990) is a Brazilian footballer who plays as a midfielder for Manaus.

Career

Alves started his career with Brazilian third division side Luverdense, helping them earn promotion to the Brazilian second division.

Before the 2015 season, Alves signed for Boa in the Brazilian top flight, where he made 11 appearances and scored 1 goal.

In 2015, he signed for Brazilian second division club Paysandu.

Before the 2016 season, Alves signed for Goianiense in the Brazilian fifth division.

In 2016, he signed for Brazilian third division team Cuiabá.

Before the 2017 season, he signed for Suphanburi in Thailand after registering for Syrian citizenship to qualify as an Asian player.

Before the 2018 season, Alves signed for Brazilian fourth division outfit Caxias.

In 2018, he signed for Brasil de Pelotas in the Brazilian second division.

Before the 2019 season, he signed for Brazilian fifth division side Aimoré.

In 2019, Alves signed for Patrocinense in the Brazilian fourth division.

Before the 2020 season, he signed for Brazilian third division club Manaus

References

External links
 
 Gilson Alves at playmakerstats.com

Brazilian footballers
People from Ribeirão Preto
Brazilian expatriate footballers
Brazilian expatriate sportspeople in Thailand
Expatriate footballers in Thailand
Living people
1990 births
Association football midfielders
Campeonato Brasileiro Série C players
Campeonato Brasileiro Série D players
Campeonato Brasileiro Série B players
Gilson Alves
Luverdense Esporte Clube players
Boa Esporte Clube players
Paysandu Sport Club players
Atlético Clube Goianiense players
Cuiabá Esporte Clube players
Gilson Alves
Sociedade Esportiva e Recreativa Caxias do Sul players
Grêmio Esportivo Brasil players
Clube Esportivo Aimoré players
Clube Atlético Patrocinense players
Manaus Futebol Clube players
Footballers from São Paulo (state)